Andrea K. Schroeder (June 2, 1964 – October 1, 2021) was an American politician who served as a Republican member of the Michigan House of Representatives from 2019 to 2021.

Education 
Schroeder earned a Bachelor of Science degree in child and family studies and early childhood education from Miami University. In 1987, Schroeder attended Wheelock College. In 2006, Schroeder graduated from the Michigan Political Leadership program from Michigan State University.

Career 
Prior to entering politics, Schroeder was a teacher.

In 2012, Schroeder became a member of the board of trustees of Chartered Township of Independence until 2018.

On August 5, 2014, Schroeder lost the Republican primary for district 43 in the Michigan House of Representatives. Schroeder had 28.91% of the votes and she was defeated by Jim Tedder with 30.54% of the votes.

On November 6, 2018, Schroeder won the election and became a Republican member of the Michigan House of Representatives for the 43rd district. Schroeder defeated Nicole Breadon with 56.52% of the votes.

Schroeder was the Vice chairperson of the Financial Services Committee.

Before her election to the state legislature, Schroeder was a teacher and operated a consulting business.

Personal life 
Schroeder and her husband, Mark, had three children. Schroeder and her family lived in Independence Township, Michigan.

Schroeder died on October 1, 2021, at the age of 57 after being diagnosed with stomach cancer.

See also 
 2018 Michigan House of Representatives election
2020 Michigan House of Representatives election

References

External links 
 Andrea Schroeder at ballotpedia.org

1964 births
2021 deaths
Deaths from stomach cancer
Deaths from cancer in Michigan
Republican Party members of the Michigan House of Representatives
Miami University alumni
Wheelock College alumni
Women state legislators in Michigan
21st-century American women politicians
21st-century American politicians
Politicians from Detroit